"Ricki Lake" is a song performed by Israeli singer Netta. The song was released as a digital download on 4 February 2020 as the fourth single from her debut extended play Goody Bag. The song was written by Brandi Nicole Flores, Chaz Jackson, Dashawn “Happie” White, Emily Vaughn and Netta Barzilai.

Background
The song references the American actress, who is best known for playing Tracy Turnblad in the 1988 film Hairspray.

Music video
A music video to accompany the release of "Ricki Lake" was first released onto YouTube on 6 February 2020. The video was directed by Roy Raz.

Track listing

Personnel
Credits adapted from Tidal.
 Avshalom Ariel – producer
 Tha Aristocrats – producer, engineer
 Brandi Nicole Flores – composer
 Chaz Jackson – composer
 Deshawn Quincy White – composer
 Emily Vaughn – composer
 Netta Barzilai – composer
 Chris Gehringer – engineer

Charts

Release history

References

2020 singles
2020 songs
Netta Barzilai songs
English-language Israeli songs
BMG Rights Management singles
Number-one singles in Israel